The Royal Gallery of Illustration was a 19th-century performance venue located at 14 Regent Street in London. It was in use between 1850 and 1873.

The gallery was built in the 1820s by the architect John Nash as part of his own house, to display his considerable collection of paintings. In 1850 the building was named the Gallery of Illustration, and between then and 1855 it housed a diorama created and run by the theatrical scene-painters Thomas Grieve and William Telbin.

From 1856 to 1873 the gallery was in the hands of the singer and actress Priscilla Horton and her husband German Reed. Their entertainments developed from songs and comedy with piano accompaniment to programmes of short plays and operettas. In deference to respectable mid-Victorian doubts about the propriety of theatres, the Reeds called their productions "entertainments", and avoided the use of the words "theatre", "play" and other theatrical terms. Under the Reeds the gallery played an important part in the development of a new generation of authors, composers and performers. Among the writers whose works the Reeds staged were W. S. Gilbert and F. C. Burnand, and their composers included Arthur Sullivan, Frederic Clay and Alfred Cellier. The performers Arthur Cecil, Corney Grain and Fanny Holland made their names at the gallery early in their careers.

The lease of the building expired in 1873, and it ceased to be used as a performance venue. The Reeds moved to another theatre, and the gallery became a banqueting hall.

History

1824–1855

The gallery was built by the architect John Nash, designer of Regent Street, Regent's Park, and other urban improvements undertaken to the commission of King George IV. The gallery was part of Nash's own residence at 14 Regent Street, completed in 1824. It originally housed copies of paintings by Raphael in the Vatican, which Nash arranged, with papal permission, to be copied by top Roman artists of the time. He allowed members of the public to view the gallery by appointment. After his death the pictures were sold. The house was bought by an auctioneer called Rainy, who made it his business premises and used the gallery to display his wares in the 1830s and 1840s.

In 1850 the theatrical scene-painters Thomas Grieve and William Telbin took on the lease of the building. They opened it in March as the Gallery of Illustration, offering a diorama display with expert commentary and music. The first show, "Diorama of the Overland Route to India", opened in March 1850 and was a success with critics and public. A reviewer wrote: 

The Morning Chronicle reported in October that the show "continues to attract overflowing audiences to the Gallery of Illustration in Regent-street. Its extensive popularity, however, is no matter for wonder, as the subject treated is perhaps the finest that can be conceived for the purposes of scenic illustration". Grieve and Telbin followed this with "Diorama of Our Native Land" (1851), "Campaigns of the Duke of Wellington" (1852), "Diorama of the Arctic Regions" (1853), and "The Seat of War" (1854). The prefix "Royal" was added to the title of the establishment by late 1852, but it is not clear on what authority, if any.

1856–1873

Early in 1856 the singer and actress Priscilla Horton began to perform at the venue. Her entertainments given at St Martin's Hall had been popular, and with her husband, German Reed, at the piano and "the pictorial aid of Messrs Grieve and Telbin", she started giving what The Morning Chronicle called "her very clever impersonations" at the Royal Gallery of Illustration. The Reeds continued to perform at the gallery for seventeen years, in what were first billed as "Miss P. Horton's Illustrative Gatherings" and then "Mr and Mrs German Reed's Entertainments". They quickly became public favourites: in 1859 The Daily News observed:

In 1860 the Reeds were joined by John Parry, a former concert singer and subsequently an entertainer known for his impressions of popular performers. The historian Jane W. Stedman writes that the Reeds' playbills "settled into a format, which continued even after Parry retired in 1869: a musical monologue to piano accompaniment by Parry ... preceded and/or followed by a musical piece, later two, often farcical, often a pocket operetta".

In the 1850s and 1860s theatres were regarded by a substantial part of society as not respectable. The historian Andrew Crowther writes, "Many who would gladly attend a concert, a lecture or an exhibition at a gallery would not think of setting foot in a theatre". The Reeds did not to refer to the Gallery of Illustration as a theatre, and they called their productions "illustrations" or "entertainments", acts were "parts", and roles were "assumptions", avoiding conventional theatrical terms. Stedman comments that the accompaniment of piano, harmonium, and at times a harp "also emphasized the presumably untheatrical nature of the entertainment". The author F. Anstey recalled that in his Victorian childhood there was no question of being taken to a theatre,

The stage was tiny because the long, narrow gallery could not accommodate a larger one. This restricted the Reeds to a cast of at most five performers. Much doubling of parts and quick changes were called for. The Era reported on a typical production in July 1868:

Reed experimented with what he called chamber opera – opera di camera – simplified versions of operas for his usual small forces. The first was Jessy Lea (1863), a retelling of L'elisir d'amore, with words by John Oxenford and music by George Macfarren. After seven further productions of the same nature, with original music by Macfarren and Virginia Gabriel and adaptations of Offenbach and  Michael Balfe the experiment came to an end.

At the gallery the Reeds staged nine pieces by William Brough, seven by F. C. Burnand, and five by W. S. Gilbert, whose Ages Ago (1869, with music by Frederic Clay) was the Reeds' longest-running and most frequently revived production, narrowly outdistancing Burnand and Arthur Sullivan's Cox and Box. Other authors whose works were presented there included Shirley Brooks, Henry Chorley, James Planché, Robert Reece, T. W. Robertson, Bolton Rowe and Tom Taylor. Among the composers in addition to Reed, Parry, Macfarren, Sullivan, Gabriel and Clay were Alfred Cellier and James Molloy.

The Reeds' lease of the gallery expired at the end of July 1873, and the building ceased to be used as a performance space. The programme for the last night there, on 31 July, comprised Mildred's Well; or A Romance of the Middle Ages by Burnand and Reed, Very Catching by Burnand and Molloy, and Our Garden Party by Corney Grain. The Reeds moved to St George's Hall at the opposite end of Regent Street; the gallery became the banqueting hall of the Pall Mall Restaurant, which occupied the site until 1883, when the building was leased by the new Constitutional Club.

Legacy
The historical importance of the gallery is chiefly its role in the early careers and development of leading authors, composers and performers. Several future stars had their start in the Reeds' company, including Arthur Cecil, Corney Grain and Fanny Holland. Few of the shows presented at the gallery have remained in the repertory. Gilbert's Ages Ago has been revived occasionally. Burnand and Sullivan's Cox and Box was taken up by later managements including the D'Oyly Carte Opera Company, and has continued to be revived regularly in the 21st century.

Posters

Notes, references and sources

Notes

References

Sources

External links
Information about the Gallery of Illustration
Description of an "Illustrative Gathering"
Shakespeariana, Volume 3, description of Horton and John Orlando Parry
Information and links about Gilbert's works for the Gallery
Information about Fanny Holland, who performed in scores of entertainments at the gallery

Former theatres in London